Nosferatu labridens, the curve-bar cichlid, is a species of cichlid freshwater fish endemic to the Laguna Media Luna and headwaters of the Río Verde between  above sea level in the state of San Luis Potosí, Mexico. Its range is a part of the upper Panuco River basin. It shares its distribution with the related Nosferatu bartoni. It is endangered due to habitat loss, pollution and introduced species.

References

labridens
Freshwater fish of Mexico
Endemic fish of Mexico
Pánuco River
Natural history of San Luis Potosí
Cichlid fish of North America
Endangered fish
Endangered biota of Mexico
Endangered fauna of North America
Fish described in 1903
Taxa named by Jacques Pellegrin
Taxobox binomials not recognized by IUCN